Euxoa nyctopis is a moth of the family Noctuidae. It is found in north-western India.

References 

Euxoa
Moths described in 1903
Moths of Asia